Blue Ridge is a city at the intersection of state highway 78, FM 981, and FM 545 in Collin County, Texas, United States. The population was 822 at the 2010 census, and 1,180 in 2020.

History 
Blue Ridge is named for the blue flowers found on the hills around the area by early settlers.

2017 Oil Pipeline Spill 
On January 30, 2017, 600,000 gallons of oil spilled from the Seaway Pipeline in Blue Ridge.

Geography 
Blue Ridge is located at  (33.299206, –96.401616).

Demographics 

At the 2010 census there were 822 people in 284 households, including 210 families, in the city. The population density was 733.9 people per square mile (283.4/km2). There were 323 housing units at an average density of 288.4 per square mile (111.4/km2). The racial makeup of the city was 92.60% White, 0.4% African American, 0.7% Native American, 2.8% from other races, and 3.4% from two or more races. Hispanic or Latino of any race were 13.1%.

Of the 284 households 39.8% had children under the age of 18 living with them, 54.2% were married couples living together, 15.5% had a female householder with no husband present, and 26.1% were non-families. 22.2% of households were one person and 21.5% were one person aged 65 or older. The average household size was 2.89 and the average family size was 3.38.

The age distribution was 29.4% under the age of 18, 10.7% from 18 to 24, 29.2% from 25 to 44, 21.8% from 45 to 64, and 8.9% 65 or older. The median age was 32.0 years. For every 100 females, there were 87.7 males. For every 100 females age 18 and over, there were 82.4 males.

The median household income was $44,625 and the median family income  was $67,250. Males had a median income of $31,250 versus $43,125 for females. The per capita income for the city was $19,522. About 9.8% of families and 15.2% of the population were below the poverty line, including 25.0% of those under age 18 and 46.8% of those age 65 or over; however, the margin of error for these metrics was ±10.2% for families in poverty, and ±26.7% and ±27.8% for under 18 and over 65 in poverty, respectively.

Education 
The city of Blue Ridge is served by Blue Ridge Independent School District.

Parks and recreation 
Bratcher Park is located on the west side of the town square behind Blue Ridge City Hall.

Blue Ridge is also the home of Parkhill Prairie, a 436-acre Blackland tall-grass prairie preserve located off of Collin County road 668.

References

External links

Dallas–Fort Worth metroplex
Cities in Texas
Cities in Collin County, Texas